Anders Johansson (born 1967) is a Swedish football manager. He has worked mostly as a manager of women's football teams, but also as assistant manager for both Malmö FF and Djurgårdens IF.

Johansson was the head coach for Sweden women's national under-19 football team from 2018 to 2020.

References

1967 births
Living people
Swedish football managers
Väsby IK managers
Älvsjö AIK (women) managers
FC Rosengård managers
Malmö FF non-playing staff
Djurgårdens IF Fotboll (women) managers
Djurgårdens IF Fotboll non-playing staff
Djurgårdens IF Fotboll managers
Damallsvenskan managers